A Member of Youth Parliament (MYP), is an individual aged between 11 and 18 elected by young people to represent their local area on the UK Youth Parliament. There are currently around 600 MYPs (including deputies) across the United Kingdom.

History and Election Process
The title of Member of Youth Parliament was created upon the organisation's formation in July 1999. Though only a smaller number existed at first, this has now expanded beyond 600 members, with 1625 young people standing for the position in their local areas during the 2008 annual elections.

The process of these elections differs from area to area, dependent on how the associated local government and youth bodies feel to be the best option for their circumstances. This ranges from a traditional First Past The Post, to an American-styled Electoral College.
Unlike General Elections, these do not all occur at the same time, being spaced out across the year.

Each member has at least one deputy (DMYP) that is able to fulfill their duties should they be unable. This number is not limited, as it again varies on the circumstances of the area in which the MYP is based. However MYPs from Scotland do not have DMYPs.

Scotland does not directly elect MYPs. The Scottish Youth Parliament has 200 Members of the Scottish Youth Parliament (MSYPs) by electing 2 in every Scottish Parliament constituency which returns 146 constituency MSYPs. The other 56 are appointed from voluntary organisations. Delegates to UKYP events are chosen by the Scottish Youth Parliament.

Roles
The roles of Members and Deputy Members of the Youth Parliament are based around providing a loud and active voice for the young people that they represent. This includes working in their local area with the likes of town and parish councillors and their own MP. They may also liaise with community action groups, schools, colleges, youth forums and youth centers so as to broaden their audience as widely as possible.
They also act on a regional basis, attending monthly meetings in which they work on developing the issues they feel most important to young people.

An Annual Sitting is held which all members are welcome to attend. Special debates are also held within the House of Commons and House of Lords. Both of these instances are historic in their overturning of ancient protocol, requiring that only members of the respective houses be allowed to sit within them.

See also
 UK Youth Parliament

References

External links
 Official Website

Youth model government
Youth-led organizations
Youth organisations based in the United Kingdom
Political organisations based in the United Kingdom
Youth empowerment organizations
1999 establishments in the United Kingdom